The 2006–07 Florida A&M Rattlers men's basketball team represented Florida A&M University during the 2006–07 NCAA Division I men's basketball season. The Rattlers, led by third-year head coach Mike Gillespie, played their home games at the Teaching Gym as members of the Mid-Eastern Athletic Conference. They finished the season 21–14, 12–6 in MEAC play to finish in a tie for 2nd place. They won the MEAC tournament to secure the conferences automatic bid to the NCAA Tournament as one of two 16 seeds in the West region. The Rattlers tipped off tournament action in the Play-in Game against Niagara and were defeated by the Purple Eagles, 77–69.

Roster

Schedule and results

|-
!colspan=9 style=| Non-conference regular season

|-
!colspan=9 style=| MEAC regular season

|-
!colspan=9 style=| MEAC tournament

|-
!colspan=9 style=| NCAA tournament

References

Florida A&M Rattlers basketball seasons
Florida AandM Rattlers
Florida AandM Rattlers